The Albanians of Kosovo, also commonly called Kosovo Albanians, Kosovar/Kosovan Albanians or occasionally "Kosovars/Kosovans", constitute the largest ethnic group in Kosovo.

Kosovo Albanians belong to the ethnic Albanian sub-group of Ghegs, who inhabit the north of Albania, north of the Shkumbin river, Kosovo, southern Serbia, and western parts of North Macedonia. They speak Gheg Albanian, more specifically the Northwestern and Northeastern Gheg variants.

According to the 1991 Yugoslav census, boycotted by Albanians, there were 1,596,072 ethnic Albanians in Kosovo or 81.6% of population. By the estimation in the year 2000, there were between 1,584,000 and 1,733,600 Albanians in Kosovo or 88% of population; as of 2011, their population share is 92.93%.

History

Pre-7th century 
Toponymical evidence suggests that Albanian was spoken in western and eastern Kosovo and the Niš region before the Migration Period. In this era, Albanian in Kosovo was in linguistic contact with Eastern Romance which was presumably spoken in contemporary eastern Serbia and Macedonia.

Middle Ages 
Between 1246 and 1255, Stefan Uroš I had reported Albanian toponyms in the Drenica valley. A chrysobull of the Serbian Tsar Stefan Dušan that was given to the Monastery of Saint Mihail and Gavril in Prizren between the years of 1348-1353 states the presence of Albanians in the Plains of Dukagjin, the vicinity of Prizren and in the villages of Drenica.

In the 14th century in two chrysobulls or decrees by Serbian rulers, villages of Albanians alongside Vlachs are cited in the first as being between the White Drin and Lim rivers (1330), and in the second (1348) a total of nine Albanian villages are cited within the vicinity of Prizren. Toponyms such as Arbanaška and Đjake shows an Albanian presence in the Toplica and Southern Morava regions (located north-east of contemporary Kosovo) since the Late Middle Ages. Significant clusters of Albanian populations also lived in Kosovo especially in the west and centre before and after the Habsburg invasion of 1689–1690, while in Eastern Kosovo they were a small minority. Due to the Ottoman-Habsburg wars and their aftermath, Albanians from contemporary northern Albania and Western Kosovo settled in wider Kosovo and the Toplica and Morava regions in the second half of the 18th century, at times instigated by Ottoman authorities. Causes for the Albanian emigration would be the benefits Muslim Albanians received in Kosovo, in contrast to Christian Serbs who left Kosovo to settle further north in Hungary.  Some historians have challenged this and argue there was never a mass exodus of Serbs during these periods nor a vacuum that were filled by Albanians from northern Albania.Migrations into the region were slow processes rather than populations filling up vacuums And the people that revolted against Ottoman rule in Kosovo in 1690 during the Ottoman-Habsburg wars were described by Austrians as Albanians rather than Serbs. This was also noted by the Austrian scholar Johann Georg von Hahn.  One early account states that in Prishtina 5,000 Arnauts, having thrown off the Turks. Among the papers of Ludwig von Baden in Karlsruhe, there is a copy of an intercepted letter, in French, written by a secretary of the English Embassy in Istanbul on 19 January 1690: it reports that the 'Germans' in Kosovo have made contact with 20,000 Albanians who have turned their weapons against the Turks.Count Veterani, the commander of the Austrian campaign in 1690, wrote in his memoirs of 20,000 Arnauts reduced to loyal obedience to the Emperor by Piccolomini. And one of Piccolominis own officers, Colonel von Strasser, reported to Ludwig von Baden that Piccolomini had gone to Prizren in order to treat with 'The Albanians, Arnauts, and others (mit den Albanesernen, Arnauten und anderen')

According to Noel Malcolm, a large part of the Albanian demographic growth in Kosovo was from an indigenous population within the Kosovo region itself rather than a mass immigration from northern Albania. Most of the new arrivals into Kosovo that were recorded by Ottoman officials in the early period had Slavic names rather than Albanian, many of these coming from Bosnia Kingsley (2022) argues that because an overwhelming majority of modern-day Kosovo municipalities are Slavic in their toponymy with the partial exception of Prizren and Gjakova, this suggests that the majority of contemporary Albanians in Kosovo entered the region of Kosovo following the Slavic migrations to the Balkans. By the 1600s, large parts of Western Kosovo were majority Albanian speaking and migrations from northern Albania into Kosovo at this period were relatively very small compared to the already existing Albanian population in Kosovo. The population of northern and central Albania in the early Ottoman period was also smaller than that of the population of Kosovo and it's rate of growth higher.

In the Middle Ages, more Albanians in Kosovo were concentrated in the western parts of the region than in its eastern part. In the late 17th century, most intensively between mid-18th century and the 1840s they seem to have moved eastwards. The migrating parts of tribes maintained a tribal outlook and household structure. A 1930s Serbian study by Atanasije Urošević estimated that 90% of Kosovo Albanians in particular areas of eastern Kosovo descended from these migrating tribes; most belonged to the Krasniqi, the rest to the Berisha, Gashi, Shala, Sopi, Kryeziu, Thaçi and Bytyqi tribes. Historian Noel Malcolm has criticized the Urošević study for its broad generalization to the whole of Kosovo, as it focused on Eastern Kosovo, while omitting Western Kosovo to reach those conclusions. Malcolm also noted that commonalities of Kosovo Albanian family names with Albanian clan names is not always indicative of having Albanian Malësi clan origins, as some people were agglomerated into clans while many other Kosovo Albanians lack such names. The study also revealed that the same population figures between older and newer settlement patterns were the same for the Serb population in eastern Kosovo as most had settled in the area in the last 200 years.

Kosovo was part of the Ottoman Empire from 1455 to 1912, at first as part of the eyalet of Rumelia, and from 1864 as a separate province (vilayet). During this time, Islam was introduced to the population. Today, Sunni Islam is the predominant religion of Kosovo Albanians.

The Ottoman term Arnavudluk (آرناوودلق) meaning Albania was used in Ottoman state records for areas such as southern Serbia and Kosovo. Evliya Çelebi (1611–1682) in his travels within the region during 1660 referred to the western and central part of what is today Kosovo as Arnavudluk and described the town of Vučitrn's inhabitants as having knowledge of Albanian or Turkish with few speakers of Slavic languages.

Modern period

19th century 

A large number of Albanians alongside smaller numbers of urban Turks (with some being of Albanian origin) were expelled and/or fled from what is now contemporary southern Serbia (Toplica and Morava regions) during the Serbian–Ottoman War (1876–78). Many settled in Kosovo, where they and their descendants are known as muhaxhir, also muhaxher ("exiles", from Arabic 'muhajir'), and some bear the surname Muhaxhiri/Muhaxheri or most others the village name of origin. During the late Ottoman period, ethno-national Albanian identity as expressed in contemporary times did not exist amongst the wider Kosovo Albanian-speaking population. Instead collective identities were based upon either socio-professional, socio-economic, regional, or religious identities and sometimes relations between Muslim and Christian Albanians were tense.
 
As a reaction against the Congress of Berlin, which had given some Albanian-populated territories to Serbia and Montenegro, Albanians, mostly from Kosovo, formed the League of Prizren in Prizren in June 1878. Hundreds of Albanian leaders gathered in Prizren and opposed the Serbian and Montenegrin jurisdiction. Serbia complained to the Western Powers that the promised territories were not being held because the Ottomans were hesitating to do that. Western Powers put pressure to the Ottomans and in 1881, the Ottoman Army started the fighting against Albanians. The Prizren League created a Provisional Government with a President, Prime Minister (Ymer Prizreni) and Ministries of War (Sylejman Vokshi) and Foreign Ministry (Abdyl Frashëri). After three years of war, the Albanians were defeated. Many of the leaders were executed and imprisoned. In 1910, an Albanian uprising spread from Pristina and lasted until the Ottoman Sultan's visit to Kosovo in June 1911. The aim of the League of Prizren was to unite the four Albanian-inhabited Vilayets by merging the majority of Albanian inhabitants within the Ottoman Empire into one Albanian vilayet. However at that time Serbs consisted about 25% of the whole Vilayet of Kosovo's overall population and were opposing the Albanian aims along with Turks and other Slavs in Kosovo, which prevented the Albanian movements from establishing their rule over Kosovo.

20th century 

In 1912 during the Balkan Wars, most of eastern Kosovo was taken by the Kingdom of Serbia, while the Kingdom of Montenegro took western Kosovo, which a majority of its inhabitants call "the plateau of Dukagjin" (Rrafshi i Dukagjinit) and the Serbs call Metohija (Метохија), a Greek word meant for the landed dependencies of a monastery. Aside from many war crimes and atrocities committed by the Serbian Army on the Albanian population, colonist Serb families moved into Kosovo, while the Albanian population was decreased. As a result, the proportion of Albanians in Kosovo declined from 75 percent at the time of the invasion to slightly more than 65% percent by 1941.

The 1918–1929 period under the Kingdom of the Serbs, Croats and Slovenes was a time of persecution of the Kosovar Albanians. Kosovo was split into four counties—three being a part of official Serbia: Zvečan, Kosovo and southern Metohija; and one in Montenegro: northern Metohija. However, the new administration system since 26 April 1922 split Kosovo among three Regions in the Kingdom: Kosovo, Rascia and Zeta.

In 1929 the Kingdom was transformed into the Kingdom of Yugoslavia. The territories of Kosovo were split among the Banate of Zeta, the Banate of Morava and the Banate of Vardar. The Kingdom lasted until the World War II Axis invasion of April 1941.
 

After the Axis invasion, the greater part of Kosovo became a part of Italian-controlled Fascist Albania, and a smaller, Eastern part by the Axis allied Tsardom of Bulgaria and Nazi German-occupied Serbia. Since the Albanian Fascist political leadership had decided in the Conference of Bujan that Kosovo would remain a part of Albania they started expelling the Serbian and Montenegrin settlers "who had arrived in the 1920s and 1930s".
Prior to the surrender of Fascist Italy in 1943, the German forces took over direct control of the region. After numerous Serbian and Yugoslav Partisans uprisings, Kosovo was liberated after 1944 with the help of the Albanian partisans of the Comintern, and became a province of Serbia within the Democratic Federal Yugoslavia.
 
The Autonomous Region of Kosovo and Metohija was formed in 1946 to placate its regional Albanian population within the People's Republic of Serbia as a member of the Federal People's Republic of Yugoslavia under the leadership of the former Partisan leader, Josip Broz Tito, but with no factual autonomy. This was the first time Kosovo came to exist with its present boundaries. After Yugoslavia's name changed to the Socialist Federal Republic of Yugoslavia and Serbia's to the Socialist Republic of Serbia in 1963, the Autonomous Region of Kosovo was raised to the level of Autonomous Province (which Vojvodina had had since 1946) and gained inner autonomy in the 1960s.

In the 1974 constitution, the Socialist Autonomous Province of Kosovo's government received higher powers, including the highest governmental titles—President and Premier and a seat in the Federal Presidency, which made it a de facto Socialist Republic within the Federation, but remaining as a Socialist Autonomous Region within the Socialist Republic of Serbia. Serbo-Croat and Albanian were defined official on the provincial level marking the two largest linguistic Kosovan groups: Serbs and Albanians. The word Metohija was also removed from the title in 1974 leaving the simple short form, Kosovo.

In the 1970s, an Albanian nationalist movement pursued full recognition of the Province of Kosovo as another Republic within the Federation, while the most extreme elements aimed for full-scale independence. Tito's government dealt with the situation swiftly, but only giving it a temporary solution.

In 1981 the Kosovar Albanian students organised protests seeking that Kosovo become a republic within Yugoslavia. Those protests were harshly contained by the centralist Yugoslav government. In 1986, the Serbian Academy of Sciences and Arts (SANU) was working on a document, which later would be known as the SANU Memorandum. An unfinished edition was filtered to the press. In the essay, SANU portrayed the Serbian people as a victim and called for the revival of Serb nationalism, using both true and exaggerated facts for propaganda. During this time, Slobodan Milošević rose to power in the League of the Socialists of Serbia.

Soon afterwards, as approved by the Assembly in 1990, the autonomy of Kosovo was revoked, and the pre-1974 status reinstated. Milošević, however, did not remove Kosovo's seat from the Federal Presidency, but he installed his own supporters in that seat, so he could gain power in the Federal government. After Slovenia's secession from Yugoslavia in 1991, Milošević used the seat to obtain dominance over the Federal government, outvoting his opponents.

Many Albanians organized a peaceful active resistance movement, following the job losses suffered by some of them, while other, more radical and nationalistic oriented Albanians, started violent purges of the non-Albanian residents of Kosovo.

On 2 July 1990, an unconstitutional ethnic Albanian parliament declared Kosovo an independent country, although this was not recognized by the Government since the ethnic Albanians refused to register themselves as legal citizens of Yugoslavia. In September of that year, the ethnic Albanian parliament, meeting in secrecy in the town of Kačanik, adopted the Constitution of the Republic of Kosova. A year later, the Parliament organized the 1991 Kosovan independence referendum, which was observed by international organisations, but was not recognized internationally because of a lot of irregularities. With an 87% turnout, 99.88% voted for Kosovo to be independent. The non-Albanian population, at the time comprising 10% of Kosovo's population, refused to vote since they considered the referendum to be illegal. In the early nineties, ethnic Albanians organised a parallel state system and a parallel system of education and healthcare, among other things, Albanians organized and trained, with the help of some European countries, the army of the self-declared Kosovo republic called the Kosovo Liberation Army (KLA). With the events in Bosnia and Croatia coming to an end, the Yugoslav government started relocating Serbian refugees from Croatia and Bosnia to Kosovo. The KLA managed to re-relocate Serbian refugees back to Serbia..
 

After the Dayton Agreement in 1995, a guerilla force calling itself the Kosovo Liberation Army (KLA) started to operate in Kosovo, although there are speculations that they may have started as early as 1992. Serbian paramilitary forces committed war crimes in Kosovo, although the Serbian government claims that the Army was only going after suspected Albanian terrorists. This triggered a 78-day NATO bombing campaign in 1999. The Albanian Kosovar KLA played a major role not only in reconnaissance missions for the NATO, but in sabotaging the Serbian Army as well.

21st century 

International negotiations began in 2006 to determine the final status of Kosovo, as envisaged under UN Security Council Resolution 1244, which ended the Kosovo conflict of 1999. While Serbia's continued sovereignty over Kosovo is recognised by much of the international community, a clear majority of Kosovo's population prefers independence. The UN-backed talks, led by UN Special Envoy Martti Ahtisaari, began in February 2006. While progress was made on technical matters, both parties remained diametrically opposed on the question of status itself. In February 2007, Ahtisaari delivered a draft status settlement proposal to leaders in Belgrade and Pristina, the basis for a draft UN Security Council Resolution that proposes 'supervised independence' for the province. As of early July 2007 the draft resolution, which is backed by the United States, United Kingdom and other European members of the United Nations Security Council, had been rewritten four times to try to accommodate Russian concerns that such a resolution would undermine the principle of state sovereignty. Russia, which holds a veto in the Security Council as one of five permanent members, has stated that it will not support any resolution that is not acceptable to both Belgrade and Pristina.

On 26 November 2019, an earthquake struck Albania. The Kosovo Albanian population reacted with sentiments of solidarity through fundraising initiatives and money, food, clothing and shelter donations. Volunteers and humanitarian aid in trucks, buses and hundreds of cars from Kosovo traveled to Albania to assist in the situation and people were involved in tasks such as the operation of mobile kitchens and gathering financial aid. Many Albanians in Kosovo have opened their homes to people displaced by the earthquake.

Demographics

Diaspora 

There is a large Kosovo Albanian diaspora in central Europe.

Culture 

Culturally, Albanians in Kosovo are very closely related to Albanians in Albania. Traditions and customs differ even from town to town in Kosovo itself. The spoken dialect is Gheg, typical of northern Albanians. The language of state institutions, education, books, media and newspapers is the standard dialect of Albanian, which is closer to the Tosk dialect.

Religion 

The vast majority of Kosovo Albanians are Sunni Muslims. There are also Catholic Albanian communities estimated between 60,000 to 65,000 in Kosovo, concentrated in Gjakova, Prizren, Klina and a few villages near Peja and Viti. Converting to Christianity is growing among Kosovo Albanian Muslims in Kosovo.

Art 
Kosovafilmi is the film industry, which releases movies in Albanian, created by Kosovar Albanian movie-makers. The National Theatre of Kosovo is the main theatre where plays are shown regularly by Albanian and international artists.

Music 

Music has always been part of Albanian culture. Although in Kosovo music is diverse (as it was mixed with the cultures of different regimes dominating Kosovo), authentic Albanian music does still exist. It is characterized by use of çiftelia (an authentic Albanian instrument), mandolina, mandola and percussion.

Folk music is very popular in Kosovo. There are many folk singers and ensembles.

Modern music in Kosovo has its origin from western countries. The main modern genres include pop, hip hop/rap, rock, and jazz.

Kosovo Radiotelevisions like RTK, RTV21 and KTV have their musical charts.

Education 
Education is provided for all levels, primary, secondary, and university degrees. University of Pristina is the public university of Kosovo, with several faculties and majors. The National Library (BK) is the main and the largest library in Kosovo, located in the centre of Pristina. There are many other private universities, among them American University in Kosovo (AUK), and many secondary schools and colleges such as Mehmet Akif College.

Notable people

See also 

 Albanians
 Albanian nationalism in Kosovo
 Albania-Kosovo relations

Notes

References

Sources 

 
Ethnic groups in Kosovo